The Italian highway 36, Lake Como and Spluga (SS 36) is a major road in Lombardy. It provides the main access route to the Valtellina and the Swiss canton of Grisons from Milan and other cities in southern Lombardy.

The Path

The road begins from Lagosta square in Milan along Viale Zara and Viale Fulvio Testi, north of Milan. ANAS manages the road starting at 8590 km, near the exit Sesto San Giovanni of the A4 (Highway A4). In Monza the road takes the name Viale Lombardia and goes underground since 2013.

In Monza it turns into the New Valassina, a six-lane highway that crosses the entire Brianza passing near Muggiò, Lissone, Desio, Seregno, Carate Brianza, Verano Brianza and Giussano. In Giussano, lanes become four. The road then shifts east towards Lecco. From Civate, where the highway ended until 2000, the road continues to Lecco through a tunnel in the Monte Barro and a tunnel that crosses the center of the city, with the two directions being place one above the other. In Lecco it's an urban road with two carriageways facing  Lake Como.

Near the centre of Abbadia Lariana the Colico-Lecco highway, four lanes total, while the old route, a single carriageway, along the lake through all the coastal stations. The two paths meet at the junction of Piantedo. From Chiavenna the road climbs up to the Spluga Pass.

History 

The name New Valassina is due to the original design of the road, which aimed to connect Erba with low Brianza and Milan, along the course of the Valassina, crossed the river Lambro.

The section going through the Monte Barro tunnel and the tunnel below the center of Lecco was opened in 1999. Previously, the path from Civate went along Valmadrera, Malgrate and through the Kennedy bridge to  Lecco City.

Viale Lombardia tunnel 

Since 2013, the road goes through an urban tunnel in Monza, about 1800 meters long, under viale Lombardia. As of 2016, the tunnel was used 20 million times per year.

The tunnel was pushed since 1996 by the "Committee San Fruttuoso" and others. The project was accepted by the ministry of transportation in 2008; works began in January 2009 and completed in April 2013. The project cost 330 million euros (revised to 345) and was funded by State, Region, province, and municipalities of Monza, Cinisello Balsamo and Muggiò ALSI and Spa (South Lambro Spa water - the wastewater company of Monza and Brianza).

Speed limits
The speed limit on SS36 is 90 km/h, although it is reduced to 70 km/h between Abbadia Lariana and Lecco itself.

Detailed path

References

External links
 official website that tracks the progress of work at the junction of Monza
 Site association of citizens who proposed and obtained the creation of the tunnel in Monza

036
Road tunnels in Italy